Daniel Smith House is a historic home located at Huntington in Suffolk County, New York. It consists of a -story, five bay, dwelling built about 1855, with a -story three bay south wing, built about 1830.  It is an intact example of late period architecture in Huntington.

It was added to the National Register of Historic Places in 1985.

References

Houses on the National Register of Historic Places in New York (state)
Houses completed in 1830
Houses in Suffolk County, New York
1830 establishments in New York (state)
National Register of Historic Places in Suffolk County, New York